Matatirtha Temple is a Hindu temple in Matatirtha, Chandragiri Municipality, Nepal.

The temple is famous for the Matatirtha Aunsi festival, a day to honour mothers and motherhood. According to the legends, during ancient Nepal a farmer visited the pond in the premises of the temple to quench his thirst whilst drinking it, he saw his late mother's face reflected in the pond.

References 

Tourist attractions in Bagmati Province
Hindu temples in Kathmandu District